Marco Krainz (born 17 May 1997) is an Austrian professional footballer who plays as a midfielder for Blau-Weiß Linz.

Krainz has represented Austria at various youth levels, captaining the Austria U19 team.

References

External links

1997 births
Footballers from Vienna
Living people
Austrian footballers
Austria youth international footballers
Austria under-21 international footballers
Association football midfielders
FK Austria Wien players
SC Austria Lustenau players
Floridsdorfer AC players
FC Blau-Weiß Linz players
2. Liga (Austria) players